Mariappa Kempaiah (4 March 1932 – 2 July 2008) was an Indian professional footballer who played as a midfielder. He played for the India national team at two Olympic Games. Known for his "fitness, work rate and commitment", he was considered one of India's best midfielders.

He had also played for India in the International Quadrangle Football tournament, played in the now Bangladesh in 1955 and in Asian Games held in Japan in 1958. At club level, Kempaiah played for Bangalore Muslims till 1956 before he moved to East Bengal where he played for a year. Between 1957 and 1965, he played for Mohun Bagan. In the inter-provincial Santosh Trophy, played for Mysore.

Playing career 
Kempaiah came into prominence while playing for Bangalore Muslims during the 1950s. He was subsequently discovered by Syed Abdul Rahim, then coach of the India national team, while Kempaiah played for Mysore in the Santosh Trophy in 1954 in Calcutta (now Kolkata). He made his debut for India against Sri Lanka in 1953 and was a regular in the Indian team till 1965. He was part of the team that played at the 1956 Melbourne and 1960 Rome Olympics.

Kempaiah stayed with Bangalore Muslims till 1956 before moving to East Bengal. With them he won the 1956–57 Durand Cup. 
While at Mohun Bagan, he was teammates of Chuni Goswami, Jarnail Singh and Peter Thangaraj.

Goswami said of Kempaiah, "He never got tired. His tackling, blocking and clearing were excellent. It was for these qualities that he had such a long stint in the Indian team." P. K. Banerjee recalled, "He generally played as right half, but was equally proficient in the central midfield position. He was a tremendous fighter and never got scared."

1956, and 1960 Olympics 
At the 1956 Olympics in Melbourne, India attained its best outing at the Games as they reached the semi-finals of the tournament. The team was led by Samar Banerjee and India's most successful coach Syed Abdul Rahim, who coached the team at both the 1952 and 1960 Olympics. Kempaiah, a competent midfielder, played a crucial role in the 1956 Melbourne Olympics, where India finished fourth, losing to Bulgaria in the play-off for third place. India reached the first round without playing a scheduled preliminary match. The team received a walkover because Hungary did not play. The team beat hosts Australia 4–2 and reached the semi-finals becoming the first Asian team to do so in Olympic history. At the match against Australia Neville D'Souza scored a hat trick. He scored two goals in the first half at the ninth and 33rd minutes. The first was a nod to the rebound from captain Samar Banerjee's shot to the opponent's post. Then in the 33rd minute D'Souza converted a cross from P. K. Banerjee who sent the ball into the net from the right flank. A third goal was scored in the second half at the 50th minute when Banerjee converted a free ball received from a melee between Indian striker Muhammad Kannayan and Australian goalkeeper Ron Lord. The fourth Indian goal was scored by J. Krishnaswamy at the 80th minute. Bruce Morrow scored two goals for the hosts.

However, India failed to reach the final losing to Yugoslavia by 4–1 in the semi finals. There were no goals scored in the first half. D'Souza scored the opening goal in the match for India at the 52nd minute, but in the next 15 minutes Yugoslavia scored three goals at the 54th, 57th and 65th minutes. A mistake by Indian defender Muhammad Salaam led to an own goal at the 78th minute ensuring Yugoslavia's victory in the match. After the loss, India faced Bulgaria in the bronze medal match where they were again defeated by a score of 3–0. With four goals Neville D'Souza became joint top scorer in that edition of the Games with Todor Veselinović of Yugoslavia and Dimitar Stoyanov of Bulgaria. 
 
At 1960 Olympics in Rome, India was placed in a group with strong sides from Hungary, France and Peru. The team was led by P. K. Banerjee under the coaching of Syed Abdul Rahim. Tulsidas Balaram scored two goals, one each in the matches against Hungary and Peru, both of which India lost. In the second match  Banerjee's goal in the 71st minute would help India hold France to a draw. With two losses and a draw, India placed at the bottom of the group and failed to move to the next round. This was the last time India qualified for the Olympics in football.

Individual honours and appreciations 
Kempaiah won numerous awards during his playing career as well as after retirement for his contribution to Indian football.

The major awards won by him are:
 Best Wing half Award: 1962
 Facilitated by the Karnataka chief minister for his achievement in sports in 1968
 Award from the Karnataka Football Association in 1983
 Sportsman of the Millennium: 2000

Death 
Kempaiah died in Bengaluru on Wednesday, 2 July 2008, after a prolonged illness with diabetes.

Other activities 
Kempaiah was a very versatile person. He was a boxer before choosing football as a career. He had a lot of long-distance runs to his caliber before his passion for football arose.

Honours
Mohun Bagan
Durand Cup: 1959, 1960, 1963, 1964, 1965
IFA Shield: 1960, 1961, 1962
Calcutta Football League: 1959, 1960, 1962, 1963, 1964, 1965

India
Colombo Cup: 1955
Merdeka Tournament runner-up: 1959
1956 Summer Olympics Fourth Place: 1956

See also
 History of Indian football
 History of the India national football team
 India national football team at the Olympics
 List of India national football team hat-tricks

References

Bibliography

External links
 
 Mohun Bagan Athletic Club : Kempaiah Passes Away

Indian footballers
India international footballers
2008 deaths
1932 births
Footballers at the 1956 Summer Olympics
Footballers at the 1960 Summer Olympics
Olympic footballers of India
Footballers at the 1958 Asian Games
Footballers from Bangalore
Athletes from Bangalore
Association football midfielders
Asian Games competitors for India
Bangalore Muslims FC players
Calcutta Football League players
East Bengal Club players
Mohun Bagan AC players